Juqin may refer to:
 Juqin, Iran, Zanjan Province
 Juqin Rural District, in Tehran Province